Natalie Anne Harvey (born 19 January 1975) is an Australian former long-distance runner. She competed in the women's 5000 metres at the 1996 Summer Olympics.

References

External links
 

1975 births
Living people
Athletes (track and field) at the 1996 Summer Olympics
Athletes (track and field) at the 2000 Summer Olympics
Australian female long-distance runners
Olympic athletes of Australia
Place of birth missing (living people)
20th-century Australian women
21st-century Australian women